Mikhail Aleksandrovich Demyanov (Russian: Михаил Александрович Демьянов; 7 December 1873, Arti - 23 June 1913, Nodenthal) was an Impressionist painter and designer; known for his landscapes and portraits. He was from the Russian Empire.

Biography 
From 1892 to 1903, he studied at the Moscow School of Painting, Sculpture and Architecture with Isaac Levitan. He received a silver medal for his work in 1899.

From 1903 to 1910, he continued his training at the graduate school of the Imperial Academy of Fine Arts with Alexander Kiselyov. Upon graduating he was awarded the title of "Artist" for his painting "Old Age" and, shortly after, was given the Yendogurov Prize (named after the landscape painting brothers, Sergey and Ivan Yendogurov), which was presented by the Academy. His work "The Breath of Spring" earned him a scholarship to study abroad.

During these years, he also created illustrations for several periodicals and did portraits of the director and several actors who were involved in a production of The Government Inspector by Gogol.

From 1910 to 1912, he travelled extensively, copying the Old Masters in Rome, Venice, Paris and Amsterdam. Upon returning to Russia, he settled in Saint Petersburg.

He died at the age of only thirty-nine, possibly from tuberculosis, while staying at a resort in Finland. A major retrospective of his work was held in 1914.

Selected paintings

References

External links

1873 births
1913 deaths
Impressionist painters from the Russian Empire
20th-century Russian painters
Landscape painters from the Russian Empire
People from Artinsky District
Moscow School of Painting, Sculpture and Architecture alumni